Neelyville is a town in Butler County in Southeast Missouri, United States. The population was 318 at the 2020 census.

Neelyville is included within the Poplar Bluff Micropolitan Statistical Area.

History
Neelyville was laid out in 1870. It was situated along the St. Louis, Iron Mountain and Southern Railway. The community was named after Obadiah Neely, an early citizen. A post office called Neelyville has been in operation since 1873.

Geography
Neelyville is located at  (36.557839, -90.509701).

Neelyville lies along U.S. Route 67 along with the future I-57 corridor

Demographics

2010 census
As of the census of 2010, there were 483 people, 181 households, and 120 families living in the city. The racial makeup of the city was 82.82% White, 12.42% Black or African American, 0.83% Native American, 0.41% Asian, and 3.52% from two or more races. Hispanic or Latino of any race were 0.41% of the population.

There were 181 households, of which 42.5% had children under the age of 18 living with them, 40.3% were married couples living together, 17.7% had a female householder with no husband present, 8.3% had a male householder with no wife present, and 33.7% were non-families. 28.2% of all households were made up of individuals, and 14.3% had someone living alone who was 65 years of age or older. The average household size was 2.67 and the average family size was 3.22.

The median age in the city was 33.9 years. 32.3% of residents were under the age of 18; 6.8% were between the ages of 18 and 24; 26.2% were from 25 to 44; 21.5% were from 45 to 64; and 13.3% were 65 years of age or older. The gender makeup of the city was 52.0% male and 48.0% female.

2000 census
As of the census of 2000, there were 487 people, 194 households, and 127 families living in the city. The population density was 419.3 people per square mile (162.1/km). There were 215 housing units at an average density of 185.1 per square mile (71.6/km). The racial makeup of the city was 79.26% White, 16.22% African American, 1.44% Native American, 0.82% Asian, 0.41% from other races, and 1.85% from two or more races.

There were 194 households, out of which 34.5% had children under the age of 18 living with them, 42.3% were married couples living together, 17.0% had a female householder with no husband present, and 34.5% were non-families. 30.9% of all households were made up of individuals, and 12.9% had someone living alone who was 65 years of age or older. The average household size was 2.51 and the average family size was 3.12.

In the city the population was spread out, with 30.0% under the age of 18, 10.3% from 18 to 24, 30.4% from 25 to 44, 19.5% from 45 to 64, and 9.9% who were 65 years of age or older. The median age was 32 years. For every 100 females, there were 91.7 males. For every 100 females age 18 and over, there were 78.5 males.

The median income for a household in the city was $21,719, and the median income for a family was $25,000. Males had a median income of $22,250 versus $15,735 for females. The per capita income for the city was $10,598. About 19.9% of families and 25.7% of the population were below the poverty line, including 32.3% of those under age 18 and 31.3% of those age 65 or over.

External links
Neelyville Regional Directory
 Historic maps of Neelyville in the Sanborn Maps of Missouri Collection at the University of Missouri

References

Cities in Butler County, Missouri
Cities in Missouri